A Gentleman of the Ring (French: Chouchou poids plume) is a 1932 French sports film directed by Robert Bibal and starring Geo Laby, Vanda Gréville and Gaston Dubosc. It is a remake of the 1926 silent film A Gentleman of the Ring.

Cast
 Arcy-Hennery
 Colette Broïdo as Moineau  
 Jean-Henri Chambois 
 Pierre Darteuil as M. Lormeau  
 Marthe Derminy as Mme Lormeau  
 Gaston Dubosc as Le comte Brodelet de Surville  
 Vanda Gréville as Diana  
 Maurice Holtzer 
 Geo Laby as Chouchou  
 Louis Lorsy 
 Germaine Noizet 
 André Numès Fils as Philibert  
 Georges Papin 
 Jacques Pills 
 Charles Redgie as Whipple  
 Georges Tabet 
 Jacques Tarride as Le marquis  
 Paul Villé

References

Bibliography 
 Crisp, Colin. Genre, Myth and Convention in the French Cinema, 1929-1939. Indiana University Press, 2002.

External links 
 

1932 films
French sports films
1930s sports films
1930s French-language films
Films directed by Robert Bibal
French black-and-white films
Remakes of French films
Sound film remakes of silent films
1930s French films